This is a list of diplomatic missions in Serbia. The country hosts 71 embassies.

Honorary consulates and trade missions are excluded from this listing.

Embassies in Belgrade

Other missions in Belgrade
  (Delegation)
 (Liaison office)

Gallery

Consular missions

Niš

Novi Pazar

Sremski Karlovci

Subotica
  (Consulate-General)
  (Consulate-General)

Vršac
  (Consulate-General)

Zaječar
  (Consulate-General)

Non-resident embassies accredited to Serbia

  (Athens)
  (Rome)
  (Paris)
  (Paris)
  (London)
  (Paris)
  (Athens)
  (Vienna)
  (Vienna)
  (Paris)
  (Budapest)
  (Rome)
  (Bern)
  (Rome)
  (Rome)
  (Stockholm)
  (Paris)
  (Budapest)
  (Strasbourg)
  (Rome)
  (Budapest)
  (Geneva)
  (Rome)
  (Paris)
  (Valletta)
  (Sofia)
  (Sofia)
  (Rome)
  (Berlin)
  (Vienna)
  (Vienna)
  (Bucharest)
  (Budapest)
  (Moscow)
  (Athens)
  (Vienna)
  (Cairo)
  (Athens)
  (Rome)
  (Bucharest)
  (Rome)
  (Berlin)

Closed embassies 
  (closed in 2012; to be reopened)
  (closed in 2006) (To be reopened)
 

  (closed in 2003) 
  (closed in 2006)  
 
  (Was accredited to the Socialist Federal Republic of Yugoslavia upon its closure in 1992; to be reopened.)
  (closed in 2006; to be reopened)

See also 
 Foreign relations of Serbia
 List of diplomatic missions of Serbia
 List of Ambassadors from Serbia
 Visa requirements for Serbian citizens

References

External links 
 The Ministry of Foreign Affairs

Serbia
Diplomatic missions